South Korea  competed at the 2019 World Aquatics Championships in Gwangju, South Korea from 12 to 28 July.

Medalists

Artistic swimming

South Korea entered 11 artistic swimmers.

Women

 Legend: (R) = Reserve Athlete

Diving

South Korea entered 8 divers.

Men

Women

Mixed

Open water swimming

South Korea qualified four male and four female open water swimmers.

Men

Women

Mixed

Swimming

South Korea entered 29 swimmers.

Men

Women

Mixed

Water polo

Men's tournament

Team roster

Lee Jin-woo
Kim Dong-hyeok
Kim Byeong-ju
Lee Seon-uk (C)
Gwon Dae-yong
Lee Seong-gyu
Gwon Yeong-gyun
Kim Moon-soo
Chu Min-jong
Han Hyo-min
Seo Kang-won
Song Jae-hoon
Jung Byeong-young
Coach: Go Ki-mura

Group A

13th–16th place semifinals

15th place game

Women's tournament

Team roster

Group B

13th–16th place semifinals

15th place game

References

World Aquatics Championships
Nations at the 2019 World Aquatics Championships
2019